Tamadon TV (meaning "civilization") is a television network channel based in Kabul, Afghanistan. The channel was founded by Ayatollah Asif Mohseni who spent $1 million setting it up in 2007. The channel broadcasts content aimed at the country's Shia Muslim minority and maintains close links to the government of Iran.

On April 1, 2022, it was reported that the ruling Taliban banned the channel from broadcasting Iranian TV shows.

See also 
 Television in Afghanistan

References 
 https://www.pajhwok.com/en/2016/02/16/108-afghan-media-workers-join-refugee-stream-europe

External links 
 Tamaddon TV

Television in Afghanistan
Mass media in Kabul
Persian-language television stations